EID, an acronym, may refer to:

 Ecological interface design, a framework for designing complex sociotechnical, real-time, and dynamic systems
 Electronic identification, digital systems used for proof of identity
 eUICC Identifier, a 32-digit unique identifier of an eUICC eSIM device, representing the identity of a mobile device to a cellular network service provider
 eSIM Identifier, a misnomer for eUICC Identifier
 Emerging infectious disease, an increasingly prevalent infectious disease
 Emotional instability disorder, a psychological condition formerly known as borderline personality disorder

See also
Eid (disambiguation)